Listen, Liberal: Or, What Ever Happened to the Party of the People? is a 2016 book by American author Thomas Frank. In the book, Frank argues that the American Democratic Party has changed over time to support elitism in the form of a professional class instead of the working class, facilitating the growth of what he considers deleterious economic inequality.

References

Footnotes

External links
 
 Media at publisher website
 Book discussion

2016 non-fiction books
American non-fiction books
Books by Thomas Frank
Metropolitan Books books
Books about politics of the United States
Books about labor history
Books about economic inequality
Books critical of modern liberalism in the United States